Limbaži District was an administrative division of Latvia, located in Vidzeme region, in the country's north-east, on the shore of the Baltic Sea. It bordered Estonia in the north, the former districts of Riga in the south and Valmiera in the east, and the Gulf of Riga in the west. It covered the territory of the medieval Livonian county of Metsepole.  The main city in the district was Limbaži.

Districts were eliminated during the administrative-territorial reform in 2009.

Districts of Latvia